Adhihāna (Pali; from adhi meaning "foundational" or "beginning" plus sthā meaning "standing"; Sanskrit, अधिष्ठान) has been translated as "decision," "resolution," "self-determination," "will", "strong determination" and "resolute determination." In the late canonical literature of Theravada Buddhism, adhihāna is one of the ten "perfections" (dasa pāramiyo), exemplified by the bodhisatta's resolve to become fully awakened.

Pāli Canon texts
While adhihāna appears sporadically in the early Pāli Canon, various late-canonical and post-canonical accounts of the Lord Buddha's past lives clearly contextualize adhihāna within the Theravadin tenfold perfections.

Digha Nikaya analysis
In the Pali Canon, in the Digha Nikaya discourse entitled, "Chanting Together" (DN 33), Ven. Sariputta states that the Buddha has identified the following:
'Four kinds of resolve (adhihānī): [to gain] (a) wisdom, (b) truth (sacca), (c) relinquishment (cāga), (d) tranquility (upasama).'

Bodhisatta Sumedho
In the late-canonical Buddhavamsa, the Bodhisatta Sumedha declares (represented in English and Pali):

Temiya the Wise

In the late-canonical Cariyapitaka, there is one account explicitly exemplifying adhiṭṭhāna, that of "Temiya the Wise" (Cp III.6). In this account, at an early age Temiya, sole heir to a throne, recalls a past life in purgatory (niraya) and thus asks for release. In response, a compassionate devatā advises Temiya to act unintelligent and foolish and to allow himself to be an object of people's scorn. Understanding the devatā's virtuous intent, Temiya agrees to this and acts as if mute, deaf and crippled. Seeing these behaviors but finding no physiological basis for them, priests, generals and countrymen decry Temiya as "inauspicious" and plan to have Temiya cast out. When Temiya is sixteen years old, he is ceremonially anointed and then buried in a pit. The account concludes:
... I did not break that resolute determination which was for the sake of Awakening itself. Mother and father were not disagreeable to me and nor was self disagreeable to me. Omniscience [sabbaññuta] was dear to me, therefore I resolutely determined on that itself. Resolutely determining on those factors I lived for sixteen years. There was no one equal to me in resolute determination — this was my perfection of Resolute Determination.

See also
 Parami (perfection)
 Pañña (wisdom)
 Sacca (truth)
 Dāna (generosity)
 Passaddhi (tranquillity)
 Nekkhamma (renunciation)
 Upekkhā (equanimity)
 Khanti (patience)
 Metta (loving-kindness)
 Vīrya (diligence)

Notes

Sources
 Horner, I.B. (trans.) (1975; reprinted 2000). The Minor Anthologies of the Pali Canon (Part III): 'Chronicle of Buddhas' (Buddhavamsa) and 'Basket of Conduct' (Cariyapitaka). Oxford: Pali Text Society. .
 Rhys Davids, T.W. & William Stede (eds.) (1921-5). The Pali Text Society’s Pali–English Dictionary. Chipstead: Pali Text Society. A general on-line search engine for the PED is available at http://dsal.uchicago.edu/dictionaries/pali/.
 Walshe, Maurice (trans.) (1987; reissued 1995). The Long Discourses of the Buddha: A Translation of the Digha Nikaya. Boston: Wisdom Publications. .

External links
 Dhammawiki
 DN 33 in the Ida B. Wells on-line library
 Adhiṭṭhāna & Anumodana Paramittas samples

Buddhist philosophical concepts